The Fussball Club Basel 1893 1974–75 season was their 81st season since the club was founded. It was their 29th consecutive season in the top flight of Swiss football after they won promotion during the season 1945–46. They played their home games in the St. Jakob Stadium. Félix Musfeld was club chairman for the fifth consecutive period.

Overview

Pre-season
Helmut Benthaus was first team manager for the tenth consecutive season. There were a few amendments to the team. Josef Kiefer, now coming to the end of his active career, went on to play for FC Breitenbach. Kiefer had been with the club for 12 seasons. Between the years 1962 and 1974 he had played a total of 355 games for Basel, 170 of these games were in the domestic league. He had won the championship five times and the Swiss Cup once. A number of other players also left the club, Teófilo Cubillas went on to Porto, Rudolf Wampfler to Fribourg, Peter Wenger went on to Nordstern Basel and Felix Tschudin moved on to local club SC Binningen. In an inwards directions Fritz Wirth joined on loan from Grenchen, Roland Schönenberger signed from Wangen bei Olten and Danish international Eigil Nielsen signed from Winterthur.

Basel played a total of 51 games in their 1974–75 season. 26 in the domestic league, seven in the Swiss Cup, four in the Swiss League Cup, five in the Cup of the Alps and nine were friendly matches. The team scored a total of 123 goals and conceded 66. Basel won all nine friendly games, of which three were played at home and the other six away.

Domestic league
The Nationalliga A season 1974–75 was contested under 14 teams. These were the top 12 teams from the previous 1973–74 season and the two newly promoted teams Luzern and Vevey-Sports. The championship was played in a double round robin. The champions would qualify for the 1975–76 European Cup, the second and third placed teams were to qualify for 1975–76 UEFA Cup and the last two teams in the table at the end of the season were to be relegated. Zürich won the championship six points ahead of both BSC Young Boys who were second and Grasshopper Club who were third. Basel finished in fourth position with 31 points. They won 11 of their 26 league games, drew nine and lost six games. They scored a total of 49 goals conceding 33. Ottmar Hitzfeld was the team's top goal scorer with 13 league goals, Roland Schönenberger second top scorer with six, Peter Ramseier, Walter Mundschin and Walter Balmer each scored five league goals. The poor results in this and the two previous seasons were now also being reflected in the match attendances. Where as in the 1971–72 season each but one match had attracted more than 10,000 spectators, this season only two games were attended by more than 10,000 people. The average number of spectators had halved within just three years.

Swiss Cup and League Cup
In the 50th Swiss Cup tournament Basel played the round of 32 on 21 September 1974 away against Chiasso in the Stadio Comunale and in the round 16 away against Zürich in the Letzigrund. The quarter-finals were two legged fixtures. Basel played the first leg on 30 October 1974 away in Stade de la Fontenette and the return leg on 3 November 1974 in the St. Jakob Stadium against Étoile Carouge. Both games ended with a 2–1 victory and so Basel qualified 4–2 on aggregate for the next round. The semi-finals were played in March against Chênois and was also a two legged fixture. In the first leg, played in Stade des Trois-Chêne, Basel achieved a 4–1 victory and the second leg ended with a 2–1 victory. The final was played on 31 March 1975 in the Wankdorf Stadium in Bern against Winterthur. Otto Demarmels scored the opening goal for Basel, E. Meyer equalised and so the game went into extra time. Walter Balmer scored the winning goal for Basel after 115 minutes. Basel were Swiss Cup winners for the fifth time in the club's history.

The Swiss League Cup ended for Basel in the semi-final as they were beaten 1–3 at home against Grasshopper Club. They had beaten Young Boys in the round of 32, Luzern in the round of 16, and Aarau in the quarter-final. Basel were not qualified to play European matches, but they played in the Coppa delle Alpi and won the group stage and thus reached the final, only to lose 1–2 against BSC Young Boys.

Coppa delle Alpi
In the Cup of the Alps Basel were drawn into group B. The first match was played at home against French team Olympique Lyonnais. The match was drawn 1–1 on 13 July 1974, Fritz Wirth equalised for Basel soon after half time after Ildo Maneiro had put the French team ahead shortly before the break. On 20 July the second round was played and Basel travelled to France to play against Nîmes Olympique. Basel won 4–2 thanks to a hat-trick from Eigil Nielsen and a goal from Ottmar Hitzfeld. Matchday three was on 23 July in Lyon and Basel won the return game against Olympique Lyonnais 3–1, thanks to goals from Jörg Stohler, Walter Balmer and Roland Schönenberger. Despite the fact that FCB lost the return game against Nîmes Olympique they were group winners and advanced to the final. The final was played on 30 July in the St. Jakob Stadium against Young Boys, but this ended with a 1–2 defeat.

Players 

 

 
 
 
 

  
 
  

  
 
 

 

 

Players who left the squad

Results 
Legend

Friendly matches

Pre-season and mid-season

Winter break and mid-season

Nationalliga

League matches

League standings

Swiss Cup

Swiss League Cup

Cup of the Alps

Group B results 

NB: teams did not play compatriots

Group B table

Final

See also
 History of FC Basel
 List of FC Basel players
 List of FC Basel seasons

References

Sources and references
 Rotblau: Jahrbuch Saison 2015/2016. Publisher: FC Basel Marketing AG. 
 Die ersten 125 Jahre. Publisher: Josef Zindel im Friedrich Reinhardt Verlag, Basel. 
 Switzerland 1974–75 at RSSSF
 Swiss League Cup at RSSSF
 Cup of the Alps 1974 at RSSSF

External links
 FC Basel official site

FC Basel seasons
Basel